The 2019–20 South Dakota State Jackrabbits women's basketball represent South Dakota State University in the 2019–20 NCAA Division I women's basketball season. The Jackrabbits, led by twentieth year head coach Aaron Johnston, compete in the Summit League. They play home games in Frost Arena in Brookings, South Dakota.

Previous season
The Jackrabbits went 28–7 overall and 15–1 in conference play, finishing first.

The Jackrabbits won the 2019 Summit League Tournament defeating Purdue Fort Wayne in the quarterfinals, Oral Roberts in the semifinals, and South Dakota in the Summit League Championship 83–71, earning the Jackrabbits an automatic bid to the 2019 NCAA Division I women's basketball tournament.

They received a six seed in the Portland Region facing the number 11 seed Quinnipiac and defeated them 76–65. In the second round, the Jackrabbits would face the number three seed Syracuse and beat them as well with a score of 75–64. For the second time this season, the Jackrabbits would lose to Oregon but in the Sweet Sixteen matchup.

Roster

Schedule

|-
!colspan=9 style=| Exhibition

|-
!colspan=9 style=| Non-conference regular season

|-
!colspan=9 style=| Summit League regular season

|-
!colspan=9 style=| Summit League Women's Tournament

Source:

Rankings
2019–20 NCAA Division I women's basketball rankings

References

South Dakota State Jackrabbits women's basketball seasons
South Dakota State
Jack
Jack